Jangan Ketawa was a Malaysian sketch comedy which aired in the early 1990s. The show was produced by Filem Karya Nusa and broadcast on TV3 in 1991 and was directed by Linda Cheong and Harith Iskander. Reruns of the programme aired on Astro Prima from 2003 until 2005. The programme was also aired on Astro Warna in 2009.

Characters
Dee
Moon 
Rambo Chin
Harith Iskandar
Sri Shan 
Ghanie
Rama
Robin
Robert
Danny

References

Malaysian comedy television series
2003 Malaysian television series debuts
2005 Malaysian television series endings
1990s Malaysian television series
2000s Malaysian television series
TV3 (Malaysia) original programming
Astro Prima original programming
Astro Warna original programming